Sassia remensa is a species of predatory sea snail, a marine gastropod mollusk in the family Cymatiidae.

Description

Distribution
This species occurs in the Australian part of the Tasman Sea; also of New Caledonia

References

 Spencer, H.G., Marshall, B.A. & Willan, R.C. (2009). Checklist of New Zealand living Mollusca. Pp 196-219. in: Gordon, D.P. (ed.) New Zealand inventory of biodiversity. Volume one. Kingdom Animalia: Radiata, Lophotrochozoa, Deuterostomia. Canterbury University Press,

External links
  Iredale, T. (1936). Australian molluscan notes, no. 2. Records of the Australian Museum. 19(5): 267-340, pls 20-24
 Beu, A. G. (1978). New records and species of Cymatiidae from the Kermadec Islands, Norfolk Ridge and New Zealand. Journal of the Malacological Society of Australia. 4(1-2): 29-42

Cymatiidae